The 2020–21 season was Budapest Honvéd FC's 110th competitive season, 16th consecutive season in the OTP Bank Liga and 111th year in existence as a football club.

Transfers

Summer

In:

Out:

Source:

Winter

In:

Out:

Source:

Nemzeti Bajnokság I

League table

Results summary

Results by round

Matches

UEFA Europa League

Qualifying round

Hungarian Cup

Statistics

Appearances and goals
Last updated on 15 May 2021.

|-
|colspan="14"|Youth players:

|-
|colspan="14"|Out to loan:

|-
|colspan="14"|Players no longer at the club:

|}

Top scorers
Includes all competitive matches. The list is sorted by shirt number when total goals are equal.
Last updated on 15 May 2020

Disciplinary record
Includes all competitive matches. Players with 1 card or more included only.

Last updated on 15 May 2021

Overall
{|class="wikitable"
|-
|Games played || 39 (33 OTP Bank Liga, 2 UEFA Europa League and 4 Hungarian Cup)
|-
|Games won || 13 (9 OTP Bank Liga, 1 UEFA Europa League and 3 Hungarian Cup)
|-
|Games drawn || 10 (10 OTP Bank Liga, 0 UEFA Europa League and 0 Hungarian Cup)
|-
|Games lost || 16 (14 OTP Bank Liga, 1 UEFA Europa League and 1 Hungarian Cup)
|-
|Goals scored || 61
|-
|Goals conceded || 55
|-
|Goal difference || +6
|-
|Yellow cards || 107
|-
|Red cards || 4
|-
|rowspan="2"|Worst discipline ||  Mohamed Mezghrani (10 , 0 )
|-
|  Donát Zsótér (8 , 1 )
|-
|rowspan="1"|Best result || 7–1 (A) v Tiszaújváros - Hungarian Cup - 20-9-2020
|-
|rowspan="2"|Worst result || 1–3 (A) v MTK Budapest - Nemzeti Bajnokság I - 21-8-2020
|-
| 0–2 (H) v Malmö - UEFA Europa League - 17-9-2020
|-
|rowspan="1"|Most appearances ||  Tomáš Tujvel (37 appearances)
|-
|rowspan="1"|Top scorer ||  Dániel Gazdag (18 goals)
|-
|Points || 46/117 (39.31%)
|-

References

External links
 Official website
 UEFA
 Fixtures and results

Budapest Honvéd FC seasons
Hungarian football clubs 2020–21 season